Li Yao (born 1992) is a Chinese handball player. She plays on the Chinese national team, and participated at the 2011 World Women's Handball Championship in Brazil.

References

1992 births
Living people
Sportspeople from Anhui
Chinese female handball players
Handball players at the 2010 Asian Games
Handball players at the 2014 Asian Games
Handball players at the 2018 Asian Games
Asian Games gold medalists for China
Asian Games silver medalists for China
Asian Games medalists in handball
Medalists at the 2010 Asian Games
Medalists at the 2018 Asian Games